Piz Grisch is a mountain of the Oberhalbstein Alps, overlooking Innerferrera in the Swiss canton of Graubünden. A small glacier lies at the base of its northern face, the Glatscher da Sut Fuina.

Panorama

References

External links

 Piz Grisch on Hikr

Ferrera
Mountains of the Alps
Alpine three-thousanders
Mountains of Switzerland
Mountains of Graubünden